The Central American Games is a quadrennial event which began in 1973.  The Games records in athletics are set by athletes who are representing one of the
ORDECA's member federations.

Men

Women

Records in defunct events

Men's events

Women's events

References

External links
Central American Games Medalists 1973–2006

Central American Games
Records
Central American Games athletics